Usman Arshad can refer to:

 Usman Arshad (cricketer, born 1983), Pakistani cricketer
 Usman Arshad (cricketer, born 1993), English cricketer